R5 RGP (Remington Gas Piston) is a carbine that was designed and manufactured by Remington Arms. It is one of many AR-15 type rifles which uses a gas piston operating system in an attempt to improve the reliability of the weapon.

User

See also
 Heckler & Koch HK416
 LWRC M6
 Barrett REC7
 SIG Sauer SIG516

References

Further information

External links
 Official Remington R5 image gallery

Remington Arms firearms
5.56 mm assault rifles
ArmaLite AR-10 derivatives
Weapons and ammunition introduced in 2006
Short stroke piston firearms